Ricardo Emilio Bofill (born 1965 in Barcelona), full Spanish name Ricardo Emilio Bofill Maggiora Vergano, also known as Ricardo Bofill Jr., is a Spanish architect, author and 
film director from Catalonia. As of late January 2022, he is co-head of the architecture and design firm Ricardo Bofill Taller de Arquitectura (RBTA), jointly with his half-brother Pablo Bofill.

Biography

Ricardo Emilio Bofill is the son of architect Ricardo Bofill, who founded RBTA in 1963, and of Italian actress Serena Vergano. He studied architecture at Rice University School of Architecture in Houston, then at Harvard Graduate School of Design, and real estate development at Columbia University. In September 1993 he married socialite Chabeli Iglesias; they separated in early 1995. From 1995 to early 2004 he was in a relationship with Mexican singer Paulina Rubio.

He joined RBTA in the late 1990s and has participated in the design of projects in China, India, and Russia.

Works

Fiction
 Perséfone (in Spanish), Barcelona: Editorial Planeta, 1995
 Bajo mi piel (in Spanish), Barcelona: Editorial Planeta, 1998

Film
  (in Spanish, featuring actors Macarena Gómez and Enrique San Francisco among others), 2005

See also
 List of works by Ricardo Bofill Taller de Arquitectura

Notes

1965 births
Living people
Architects from Catalonia
Film directors from Catalonia
Novelists from Catalonia
Rice University alumni
Harvard Graduate School of Design alumni
Columbia University alumni